Godmanchester is a township municipality located in Le Haut-Saint-Laurent Regional County Municipality in the Montérégie region of Quebec, Canada. The population as of the Canada 2011 Census was 1,417. The southeast part of the township is mostly delineated by the Chateauguay River, while the south end borders with Franklin County, New York.

It was named after Godmanchester, England in 1811.

Geography
The municipality is situated along the Canada–United States border.

Communities
The following locations reside within the municipality's boundaries:
Dewittville – a hamlet situated along Route 138 and the Chateauguay River, midway between Huntingdon and Ormstown.

Lakes & Rivers
The following waterways pass through or are situated within the municipality's boundaries:
Chateauguay River – runs along the municipality's northeast border.
Trout River – runs along the municipality's southeastern border.

Several other smaller streams and waterways also exist throughout the municipality.

Demographics 

Transportation
The CIT du Haut-Saint-Laurent provides commuter and local bus services.

See also
 List of township municipalities in Quebec

References

External links
 

Township municipalities in Quebec
Incorporated places in Le Haut-Saint-Laurent Regional County Municipality